Guillac is a commune in the Gironde department in southwestern France.

It is 32 km east of Bordeaux, 13 km north east of Creon and 5 km south west of Branne and the river Dordogne.

St Seurin's church, named after the early Bishop of Bordeaux, was originally part of the Grande-Sauve Abbey.

The part-14th-century chateau Rebullide  is one of a number of local vineyards.

Population

See also
Communes of the Gironde department

References

Communes of Gironde